Eneabba is a town on the Brand Highway  north of Perth, Western Australia.

The area is famous for its spectacular display of wildflowers in the spring. It is also home to the Iluka Resources mineral sands facility.

The first European visit to the area was in 1839 by the second disastrous George Grey expedition along the west coast. Grey and his party were forced to walk through the area after their boats were lost. On 11 April, Grey discovered and named the Arrowsmith River, after John Arrowsmith the English cartographer.

The next Europeans in the area were government Assistant Surveyor Augustus Charles Gregory and Francis Thomas Gregory (both attached to the department of the Surveyor-General) and their brother Henry Churchman Gregory, on a public-private funded expedition to search for new agricultural land beyond the settled areas.

In 1870 the first settler, William Horsley Rowland, arrived from Greenough. He took up a 3,000 acre lease at Eneabba Springs and survived by shepherding, trapping horses and pigs and living on wild game.

The area around Eneabba (also known as the Eneabba sandplain) was opened up for agricultural purposes in the 1950s for a large group of model farms comprising the Eneabba War Service Land Settlement Project. This in turn initiated the need for a town to be developed. The town was gazetted on 27 January 1961.

The name of the town means "ground spring", from the aboriginal name of Eneabba Springs, the site of Rowland's original homestead.

The Warradarge Wind Farm is being constructed southeast of Eneabba.

Climate
Eneabba has a Mediterranean climate#Hot-summer mediterranean climate (Köppen Csa).

References

External links 

 Shire of Carnamah
 The Carnamah-Winchester Database – past residents of Carnamah, Winchester and Eneabba
 The Three Springs Database – past residents of Three Springs, Arrino and Eneabba

Mining towns in Western Australia
Towns in Western Australia